Raywat Meerian is a retired professional footballer from Thailand.

He played for Krung Thai Bank FC in the 2008 AFC Champions League group stages.

Asian Champions League Appearances

References

1980 births
Living people
Raywat Meerian
Association football forwards
Raywat Meerian
Raywat Meerian
Raywat Meerian
Raywat Meerian